The Harper House is a historic home in Montverde, Florida. It is located at 17408 East Porter Avenue. On September 15, 2004, it was added to the U.S. National Register of Historic Places.

References

External links
 Great Floridians of Montverde at Florida's Office of Cultural and Historical Programs

Houses on the National Register of Historic Places in Florida
National Register of Historic Places in Lake County, Florida
Houses in Lake County, Florida